The extreme capsule (Latin: capsula extrema) is a series of nerve tracts between the claustrum and the insular cortex. It is also described as a thin capsule of white matter as association fibres. The extreme capsule is separated from the external capsule by the claustrum, and the extreme capsule separates the claustrum from the insular cortex, and all these lie lateral to the corpus striatum components. 

From the midline of the brain to the side, the extreme capsule is the outermost from the external capsule and the inner internal capsule.

It is most easily visible in a horizontal section, just lateral to the claustrum.

Additional images

See also 
 Internal capsule
 External capsule

References

External links

 
 Image at neuropat.dote.hu

Cerebrum